Lepechinia rufocampii is a species of flowering plant in the family Lamiaceae. It is endemic to central Ecuador, where it occurs in high elevation páramo environments as a prostrate perennial.

References

rufocampii
Endemic flora of Ecuador
Vulnerable plants
Páramo flora
Taxonomy articles created by Polbot